Schapiro is a surname, and may refer to:

 Alexander Schapiro, Russian anarchist
 Miriam Schapiro, Canadian-born American artist
 Boris Schapiro, British bridge player
 J. Salwyn Schapiro, American historian
 Steve Schapiro, American photojournalist
 Leonard Schapiro, British historian
 Mary Schapiro, American SEC chair (2009-2012)
 Morris Schapiro, American chess master
 Sascha Schapiro, Ukrainian anarchist
 Andrew H. Schapiro, US Ambassador

See also
 Shapiro
 Shapero
 Shapeero

Surnames
Jewish surnames
Yiddish-language surnames